Mélodie Chataigner (born 28 March 1988) is a French former pair skater. She competed with Medhi Bouzzine from 2005 to 2011, winning six French national medals and placing 8th at the 2008 European Championships.

Programs 
(with Bouzzine)

Competitive highlights 
(with Bouzzine)

References

External links 
 

French female pair skaters
1988 births
Living people
People from La Roche-sur-Yon
Sportspeople from Vendée